Theresa Park is a suburb of Wollondilly Shire in the state of New South Wales, Australia.

History
Before 1860 the area was spelt Teresa Park. The land was part of a large grant to John Terry Hughes.

References

Localities in New South Wales
Wollondilly Shire